R. Gilbert Clayton (October 15, 1922 – January 31, 2013) was an American film set designer and actor whose credits include Batman & Robin, Armageddon and The Untouchables.

Clayton enlisted in the Navy and served as a radio operator during World War II. His first set design credit was on 1975's Breakheart Pass. Clayton died on January 31, 2013, at the age of 90 in Aptos, California.

References

External links 

1922 births
2013 deaths
American scenic designers
United States Navy personnel of World War II
People from Aptos, California
Military personnel from California